Chris Lewis and Pavel Složil were the defending champions, but did not participate this year.

Boris Becker and Wojtek Fibak won the title, defeating Eric Fromm and Florin Segărceanu 6–4, 4–6, 6–1 in the final.

Seeds

  Bernard Mitton /  Butch Walts (quarterfinals)
  Mike Bauer /  Brad Drewett (first round)
  Libor Pimek /  Balázs Taróczy (quarterfinals)
  John Lloyd /  Wally Masur (quarterfinals)

Draw

Draw

External links
 Draw

1984 Grand Prix (tennis)
1984 BMW Open